The 1964 Saskatchewan general election was held on April 22, 1964, to elect members of the Legislative Assembly of Saskatchewan.

The Co-operative Commonwealth Federation (CCF) government of Premier Woodrow Lloyd was defeated by the Liberal Party, led by Ross Thatcher. The CCF had governed Saskatchewan since the 1944 election under the leadership (until December 1961) of Tommy Douglas.

By 1964 the provincial Social Credit Party had collapsed, nominating only two candidates. In another morale hit, the federal Social Credit Party endorsed the Liberals during the election. While the CCF held on to nearly all of their vote from the previous election and only trailed the Liberals by 0.1%, most of the shift in Social Credit support went to the Liberals and proved decisive in helping to push Thatcher to a majority government.

The Progressive Conservative Party also picked up some support at the expense of Social Credit but won only one seat in the legislature, that of leader Martin Pederson.

Election campaign

Douglas's government was the first social democratic government in North America, and had introduced the medicare system in Canada. This led to a 23-day strike by the province's physicians. Universal public health care, however, was not an issue in the campaign. In fact, following its successful introduction, the opposition Liberals were for expanding Medicare even more. The only provincial party to advocate eliminating Medicare was the small Social Credit Party.

The Social Credit party nominated only two candidates in the election, and they were hurt by statements by the federal Social Credit party leader, Robert N. Thompson, supporting the Saskatchewan Liberals. The Socreds' leader, Martin Kelln, chose not to spend much time on the campaign, in part because of the recent death of his mother.

The Progressive Conservatives returned to the Legislative Assembly for the first time since 1934. They won only one seat despite winning almost 19% of the popular vote. The Tories promised to keep Medicare in place, but opposed the Liberals' plans to expand it. They argued that the Liberals were too radical, and that the CCF government was not doing enough to develop the province's natural resources.

The Liberals were able to capitalize on the collapse of Social Credit and were more effective than the Tories in drawing the "anti-socialist" (anti-CCF) vote. Yet the campaign was not marked by any major issues.

There was, however, considerable animosity between the Liberals and the CCF. The Liberals employed what were called "Madison Avenue campaign tactics" and spent a lot of money on campaign advertising, especially television advertising. They tried to characterize the election as being a choice between socialism and private enterprise-oriented reform. The Saskatchewan Liberals positioned themselves as more right-wing than the federal Liberal Party of Canada and claimed that the CCF government was stagnating.

The CCF, led by former teacher Woodrow Lloyd, campaigned on the CCF record. Lloyd attacked the Liberal campaign, stating that they had resorted to "hucksterism, the kind of sales attempts that one usually associates with useless pills, second hand cars and body deodorants."

Lloyd faced several challenges: taxes in Saskatchewan were among the highest in Canada; spending on health care, welfare and education were high; and he lacked the popular support that previous CCF leader and premier Tommy Douglas had enjoyed. However, Saskatchewan had the second highest per capita income in Canada and the lowest unemployment rate in Canada.

Electoral system
In this election, Saskatchewan used a mixture of single-member districts, electing through First past the post, and multiple-member districts, electing through Plurality block voting. 

Before the next election, Saskatchewan switched to consistent single-member districts.

Results

Note: 1 One seat declared void.

Percentages

Ranking

Riding results
Names in bold represent cabinet ministers and the Speaker. Party leaders are italicized. The symbol " ** " indicates MLAs who are not running again.

Northwestern Saskatchewan

|-
|bgcolor=whitesmoke|Athabasca
|| 
|Allan Ray Guy1,076
|
|John M. Stonehocker684
|
|Harry J. Houghton909
|
|
|| 
|Allan Ray Guy
|-
|bgcolor=whitesmoke|Cut Knife-Lloydminster
|
|Raymond H. Rooney1,821
|| 
|Isidore Charles Nollet2,927
|
|Gordon Goodfellow1,617
|
|
|| 
|Isidore Charles Nollet
|-
|bgcolor=whitesmoke|Meadow Lake
|| 
|Henry Coupland3,149
|
|Martin Semchuk2,113
|
|Frederick L. Dunbar1,014
|
|
|| 
|Martin Semchuk
|-
|bgcolor=whitesmoke|Redberry
|
|Bernard L. Korchinski1,993
|| 
|Dick Michayluk2,200
|
|Walter John Dolynny1,238
|
|
|| 
|Demitro Wasyl Michayluk
|-
|bgcolor=whitesmoke|Rosthern
|| 
|David Boldt2,873
|
|George Guenther1,949
|
|
|
|Isaak Elias (Social Credit) 1,239
|| 
|David Boldt
|-
|bgcolor=whitesmoke|Shellbrook
|| 
|John Cuelenaere2,427
|
|John Thiessen2,259
|
|Norval Horner1,701
|
|
|| 
|John Thiessen
|-
|bgcolor=whitesmoke|The Battlefords
|
|Herbert O.M. Sparrow4,242
|| 
|Eiling Kramer4,645
|
|
|
|
|| 
|Eiling Kramer
|-
|bgcolor=whitesmoke|Turtleford
|
|Frank Foley2,123
|| 
|Bob Wooff2,221
|
|William Elmer Armstrong1,502
|
|
|| 
|Franklin Edward Foley

Northeastern Saskatchewan

|-
|bgcolor=whitesmoke|Cumberland
|
|Eldon McLachlan1,630
|| 
|Bill Berezowsky2,135
|
|Emanuel Sonnenschein963
|
|
|| 
|Bill Berezowsky
|-
|bgcolor=whitesmoke|Humboldt
|| 
|Mathieu Breker4,226
|
|Sylvester E. Wiegers3,030
|
|Frank J. Martin1,244
|
|
|| 
|Mary Batten**
|-
|bgcolor=whitesmoke|Kelsey
|
|William John McHugh2269
|| 
|John Hewgill Brockelbank5283
|
|Carsten Johnson703
|
|
|| 
|John Hewgill Brockelbank
|-
|bgcolor=whitesmoke|Kelvington
|| 
|Bryan Bjarnason2,888
|
|Neil Byers2,398
|
|Joseph M. Ratch1,341
|
|
|| 
|Clifford Benjamin Peterson**
|-
|bgcolor=whitesmoke|Kinistino
|
|Michael A. Hnidy3,125
|| 
|Arthur Thibault3,334
|
|
|
|
|| 
|Arthur Thibault
|-
|bgcolor=whitesmoke|Melfort-Tisdale
|
|William Ernest Hurd3,056
|| 
|Clarence George Willis3,471
|
|Kenneth Aseltine2,094
|
|
|| 
|Clarence George Willis
|-
|bgcolor=whitesmoke|Nipawin
|| 
|Frank Radloff2,652
|
|Bob Perkins2,440
|
|John A. Whittome1,942
|
|
|| 
|Robert Irvin Perkins
|-
|bgcolor=whitesmoke|Prince Albert
|| 
|Davey Steuart5,024
|
|Joseph E. Leon Lamontagne4,946
|
|Richard E. Spencer3,828
|
|
|| 
|David Gordon Steuart

West Central Saskatchewan

|-
|bgcolor=whitesmoke|Arm River
|
|Gustaf Herman Danielson2,020
|
|Emanuel Lang1,550
|| 
|Martin Pederson2,326
|
|
|| 
|Gustaf Herman Danielson
|-
|bgcolor=whitesmoke|Biggar
|
|Benson McLeod Blacklock1,992
|| 
|Woodrow S. Lloyd2,875
|
|George Loucks1,120
|
|
|| 
|Woodrow Lloyd
|-
|bgcolor=whitesmoke|Hanley
|
|Herbert C. "Charlie" Pinder3,938
|
|Robert Alexander Walker3,940
|
|Hans Taal2,602
|
|
|| 
|Robert Alexander Walker
|-
|bgcolor=whitesmoke|Kerrobert-Kindersley
|| 
|William S. Howes3,799
|
|Eldon Johnson2,937
|
|
|
|
|| 
|Eldon Arthur Johnson
|-
|bgcolor=whitesmoke|Rosetown
|| 
|George Loken2,573
|
|Allan Stevens2,367
|
|Les P. Hickson1,396
|
|
|| 
|Allan Leonard Frederick Stevens
|-
|bgcolor=whitesmoke|Watrous
|
|Neil McArthur2,602
|| 
|Hans Broten2,725
|
|
|
|
|| 
|Hans Broten
|-
|bgcolor=whitesmoke|Wilkie
|| 
|Joseph "Cliff" McIsaac3,593
|
|W. Ray Grant2,162
|
|Donald Wallace1,649
|
|
|| 
|John Whitmore Horsman**

Re-run of voided election

|-

|style="width: 130px"|CCF
|Robert Walker
|align="right"|4,608
|align="right"|45.14%
|align="right"|+7.55

|Liberal
|Herb Pinder
|align="right"|3,864
|align="right"|37.86%
|align="right"|+0.28

|Prog. Conservative
|W. Hugh Arscott
|align="right"|1,735
|align="right"|17.00%
|align="right"|-7.83
|- bgcolor="white"
!align="left" colspan=3|Total
!align="right"|10,207
!align="right"|100.00%
!align="right"|

East Central Saskatchewan

|-
|bgcolor=whitesmoke|Canora
|| 
|Ken Romuld3,391
|
|Alex Kuziak3,348
|
|
|
|
|| 
|Alex Gordon Kuziak
|-
|bgcolor=whitesmoke|Last Mountain
|| 
|Donald MacLennan2,857
|
|Russell Brown2,799
|
|
|
|Martin Kelln (Social Credit) 1,382
|| 
|Russell Brown
|-
|bgcolor=whitesmoke|Melville
|| 
|James W. Gardiner3,485
|
|William Wiwchar3,229
|
|Douglas A. Ellis1,627
|
|
|| 
|James Wilfrid Gardiner
|-
|bgcolor=whitesmoke|Pelly
|
|Jim Barrie2,669
|| 
|Leo Larson2,705
|
|Bohdan E. Lozinsky1,212
|
|
|| 
|Jim Barrie
|-
|bgcolor=whitesmoke|Saltcoats
|| 
|James Snedker3,260
|
|Baldur M. Olson2,275
|
|David Arthur Keyes1,537
|
|
|| 
|James Snedker
|-
|bgcolor=whitesmoke|Touchwood
|| 
|George Trapp2,692
|
|Frank Meakes2,566
|
|Alice M.L. Turner1,320
|
|
|| 
|Frank Meakes
|-
|bgcolor=whitesmoke|Wadena
|
|Elizabeth Mary Paulson2,580
|| 
|Fred Dewhurst3,295
|
|H.D. McPhail1,405
|
|
|| 
|Frederick Arthur Dewhurst
|-
|bgcolor=whitesmoke|Yorkton
|| 
|Barry Gallagher4,337
|
|Karl Rokeby Bartelt3,494
|
|Lawrence L. Ball1,841
|
|
|| 
|Bernard David Gallagher

Southwest Saskatchewan

|-
|bgcolor=whitesmoke|Elrose
|| 
|George Leith3,317
|
|Alex Turnbull3,263
|
|
|
|
|| 
|Olaf Alexander Turnbull
|-
|bgcolor=whitesmoke|Gravelbourg
|| 
|Leo Coderre2,999
|
|Roland Leblanc2,448
|
|
|
|
|| 
|Lionel Philas Coderre
|-
|bgcolor=whitesmoke|Maple Creek
|| 
|Alexander Cameron2,977
|
|William Percy Rolick2,424
|
|Marlyn K. Clary1,389
|
|
|| 
|Alexander C. Cameron
|-
|bgcolor=whitesmoke|Morse
|| 
|Ross Thatcher3,188
|
|Paul W. Beach2,952
|
|
|
|
|| 
|Ross Thatcher
|-
|bgcolor=whitesmoke|Notukeu-Willow Bunch
|| 
|Jim Hooker2,660
|
|Hasket Merle Sproule2,193
|
|Boyd M. Anderson946
|
|
|| 
|Karl Frank Klein**
|-
|bgcolor=whitesmoke|Shaunavon
|| 
|Fernand Larochelle2,955
|
|Art Kluzak2,545
|
|Clifford Boyd Clark1,225
|
|
|| 
|Arthur Kluzak
|-
|bgcolor=whitesmoke|Swift Current
|
|T. Lawrence Salloum4,647
|| 
|Everett Irvine Wood5,238
|
|
|
|
|| 
|Everett Irvine Wood

Southeast Saskatchewan

|-
|bgcolor=whitesmoke|Bengough
|| 
|Sam Asbell2,613
|
|Hjalmar Dahlman2,311
|
|Roy Bailey1,192
|
|
|| 
|Hjalmar Reinhold Dahlman
|-
|bgcolor=whitesmoke|Cannington
|| 
|Tom Weatherald3,852
|
|Henry George Doty2,489
|
|Glenn Brimner1,917
|
|
|| 
|Rosscoe Arnold McCarthy**
|-
|bgcolor=whitesmoke|Lumsden
|| 
|Darrel Heald2,469
|
|Cliff Thurston2,068
|
|William Clyde Tufts1,614
|
|
|| 
|Clifford Honey Thurston
|-
|bgcolor=whitesmoke|Milestone
|| 
|Cyril MacDonald2,568
|
|James M. Hubbs1,972
|
|Leonard Frederick Westrum1,023
|
|
|| 
|Jacob Walter Erb**
|-
|bgcolor=whitesmoke|Moosomin
|| 
|Alexander Hamilton McDonald4,523
|
|William Francis Goodwin3,102
|
|
|
|
|| 
|Alex "Hammy" McDonald
|-
|bgcolor=whitesmoke|Qu'Appelle-Wolseley
|| 
|Doug McFarlane3,525
|
|John Stephen Leier2,188
|
|Victor Edward Horsman2,164
|
|
|| 
|Douglas Thomas McFarlane
|-
|bgcolor=whitesmoke|Souris-Estevan
|| 
|Ian MacDougall6,220
|
|Ivar Johann Kristianson4,040
|
|
|
|
|| 
|Ian Hugh MacDougall
|-
|bgcolor=whitesmoke|Weyburn
|
|Junior Staveley4,347
|| 
|Jim Pepper4,453
|
|Jean Benson1,234
|
|
|| 
|Junior Herbert Staveley

|style="width: 130px"|Liberal
|Frank Gardner
|align="right"|3,033
|align="right"|36.72%
|align="right"|-22.60

|CCF
|William Francis Goodwin
|align="right"|2,821
|align="right"|34.14%
|align="right"|-6.54

|Prog. Conservative
|Andrew Emerson Bruce
|align="right"|2,407
|align="right"|29.14%
|align="right"|-
|- bgcolor="white"
!align="left" colspan=3|Total
!align="right"|8,261
!align="right"|100.00%
!align="right"|

|style="width: 130px"|Liberal
|Alex Mitchell
|align="right"|2,423
|align="right"|42.74%
|align="right"|+0.02

|CCF
|Hjalmar Dahlman
|align="right"|2,285
|align="right"|40.31%
|align="right"|+2.52

|Prog. Conservative
|George W. Spicer
|align="right"|961
|align="right"|16.95%
|align="right"|-2.54
|- bgcolor="white"
!align="left" colspan=3|Total
!align="right"|5,669
!align="right"|100.00%
!align="right"|

Moose Jaw and Saskatoon

|-

| style="width: 130px"|CCF
|William Davies (incumbent)
|align="right"|7,749
|align="right"|24.55%
|align="right"|-

| style="width: 130px"|CCF
|Gordon Snyder (incumbent)
|align="right"|7,550
|align="right"|23.92%
|align="right"|-

|Prog. Conservative
|Daniel J. Patterson
|align="right"|7,115
|align="right"|22.54%
|align="right"|-

|Liberal
|E. A. Astell
|align="right"|5,455
|align="right"|17.28%
|align="right"|-

|Prog. Conservative
|Gordon A. Hume
|align="right"|3,697
|align="right"|11.71%
|align="right"|-
|- bgcolor="white"
!align="left" colspan=3|Total
!align="right"|31,566
!align="right"|100.00%
!align="right"|

|-

| style="width: 130px"|CCF
|Alex M. Nicholson (incumbent)
|align="right"|16,701
|align="right"|7.83%
|align="right"|-

| style="width: 130px"|CCF
|Edward Brockelbank (elected)
|align="right"|16,559
|align="right"|7.76%
|align="right"|-

| style="width: 130px"|CCF
|Wes Robbins (elected)
|align="right"|16,126
|align="right"|7.56%
|align="right"|-

|Liberal
|Sally Merchant (elected)
|align="right"|16,068
|align="right"|7.53%
|align="right"|-

| style="width: 130px"|CCF
|Harry D. Link (elected)
|align="right"|16,041
|align="right"|7.52%
|align="right"|-

|Liberal
|Clarence Estey
|align="right"|15,761
|align="right"|7.39%
|align="right"|-

| style="width: 130px"|CCF
|Gladys Strum (incumbent)
|align="right"|15,741
|align="right"|7.38%
|align="right"|-

|Liberal
|Keith McLean Crocker
|align="right"|15,661
|align="right"|7.34%
|align="right"|-

|Liberal
|Joseph J. Charlebois
|align="right"|15,542
|align="right"|7.28%
|align="right"|-

|Liberal
|Victor C. Hession
|align="right"|14,770
|align="right"|6.92%
|align="right"|-

|Prog. Conservative
|Lewis Brand
|align="right"|11,401
|align="right"|5.34%
|align="right"|-

|Prog. Conservative
|W. Hugh Arscott
|align="right"|11,344
|align="right"|5.32%
|align="right"|-

|Prog. Conservative
|Ray Hnatyshyn
|align="right"|10,874
|align="right"|5.09%
|align="right"|-

|Prog. Conservative
|Henry Clay Rees
|align="right"|10,543
|align="right"|4.94%
|align="right"|-

|Prog. Conservative
|Irving Goldenberg
|align="right"|10,240
|align="right"|4.80%
|align="right"|-
|- bgcolor="white"
!align="left" colspan=3|Total
!align="right"|213,372
!align="right"|100.00%
!align="right"|

Regina

|-
|bgcolor=whitesmoke|Regina East
|
|Paul Dojack8,208
Jacob W. Erb8,060
|| 
|Henry Baker8,953
Walt Smishek8,395
|
|Dick Shelton2,356
George J. Tkach2,343
|
|
| colspan=2  style="background:whitesmoke; text-align:center;"|New District
|-
|bgcolor=whitesmoke|Regina North
|
|Ron Atchison3,867
|| 
|Ed Whelan4,722
|
|
|
|Norman Brudy (Communist) 68
| colspan=2  style="background:whitesmoke; text-align:center;"|New District
|-
|bgcolor=whitesmoke|Regina South
|| 
|Gordon Grant7,788
|
|George R. Bothwell3,440
|
|
|
|
| colspan=2  style="background:whitesmoke; text-align:center;"|New District
|-
|bgcolor=whitesmoke|Regina West
|
|Alex Cochrane7,770
Betty Sear6,981
|| 
|Allan Blakeney9,076
Marjorie Cooper8,413
|
|Donald K. MacPherson4,495
|
|
| colspan=2  style="background:whitesmoke; text-align:center;"|New District

See also
List of political parties in Saskatchewan
List of Saskatchewan provincial electoral districts

References

Saskatchewan Archives Board - Election Results By Electoral Division
Elections Saskatchewan: Provincial Vote Summaries

Further reading
 

1964 elections in Canada
1964 in Saskatchewan
April 1964 events in Canada
1964